7 Wishes is the third studio album recorded by American singer-songwriter Shana Morrison.  Shana had signed with Vanguard Records in 2001 and this album was released in 2002.  It received favorable reviews and air play nationally.
Two of the songs on the album were written by her father, northern irish singer-songwriter Van Morrison.  Her father joins in with her on the last verse of "Sometimes We Cry" with harmonica and vocals.

Track listing

Personnel
Shana Morrison — lead and background vocals
Van Morrison — harmonica, vocals
Steve Buckingham — acoustic, electric & baritone guitar, dulcimer, tambourine
Reggie Young — electric guitar
Chris Collins – electric & acoustic guitar, sitar, background vocals
Kenny Greenberg — electric & acoustic guitar
Bryan Sutton — acoustic guitar, mandolin
Kim Patton-Johnston — acoustic guitar background vocals
Sonny Landreth — slide guitar
Robert Powell – sitar
Michael Rhodes — bass
Matt Rollings — organ, Hammond B-3 organ
Robert Bailey — background vocals
Heidi Campbell – background vocals
Vicki Hampton – background vocals
Chris Mosher – programming
Shawn Pelton — drums, drum programming, spoken word
Shannon Forrest — drums

References

brainwashed:  Shana Morrison-family tradition localrhythms.wordpress.com

External links
 Shana Morrison: Albums

2002 albums
Albums produced by Steve Buckingham (record producer)